Emil Oberle (16 November 1889 in Karlsruhe – 25 December 1955 in Karlsruhe) was a German amateur footballer who played as a forward and competed in the 1912 Summer Olympics. He was a member of the German Olympic squad and played two matches in the consolation tournament.

References

External links

1889 births
1955 deaths
German footballers
Germany international footballers
Olympic footballers of Germany
Footballers at the 1912 Summer Olympics
Galatasaray S.K. footballers
Karlsruher SC players
Footballers from Karlsruhe
Association football forwards